Jodie Boyd-Ward (born 10 October 1992) is a wheelchair rugby league footballer who has played for three different nations at three consecutive Wheelchair World Cups. Boyd-Ward represents Wales at the 2021 tournament.  Boyd-Ward has previously represented Ireland at the 2013 World Cup and England in the 2017 World Cup.  Boyd-Ward plays domestic rugby for Leeds Rhinos wheelchair rugby league team.

Boyd-Ward was born in Wolverhampton. She was diagnosed with arthritis as a youngster and took up wheelchair sport. Initially she played wheelchair basketball before giving rugby league a try through her local sports club in Wolverhampton, a sport that at first she hated.  Encouraged by her grandfather, Boyd-Ward persevered with rugby and was approached by the Leeds Rhinos wheelchair team to move to Yorkshire Through her parents Boyd-Ward qualified to represent Ireland and was selected by Ireland to play in the inaugural Wheelchair Four Nations in 2012. Following her performances in the Four Nations Boyd-Ward was a member of the Ireland team during the 2013 Wheelchair World Cup.

The following year Boyd-Ward changed allegiance to play for England in the 2014 Four Nations tournament and went on to make 20 appearances between 2014 and 2019 including the 2017 World Cup.

In 2021 Boyd-Ward was approached by Wales to play for the Wales national team. Qualified to represent the country through her grandfather, Boyd-Ward make her debut for Wales in 2021 against Ireland in the Celtic Cup.  Boyd-Ward was selected for the Wales squad for the delayed 2021 Wheelchair Rugby League World Cup played in November 2022 in England.

At domestic level Boyd-Ward has played for Leeds Rhinos since 2013 and has won all the domestic titles and was part of the Leeds team that won the Treble (Challenge Cup, League Leaders and Super League Grand Final) in 2021 as the team went unbeaten.

References

1992 births
Living people
People from Wolverhampton
Wheelchair rugby league players
Rugby league players from Wolverhampton
English female rugby league players